The Esgueva is one of the rivers of the Iberian Peninsula, flowing from its source near Peña Cervera in the province of Burgos. It is a tributary of the Pisuerga River.

Rivers of Spain
Rivers of Burgos
Rivers of Castile and León
Tributaries of the Pisuerga